Vurg (Vourgos or Βούρκος Vourkos) is a plain and region in the southern part of Vlorë County, southwestern Albania.

The toponym means marshland, in both Albanian and Greek. Before bonification works in the Communism period, most of the Vurg area was covered with marshes. When it rained, the Kalasë and Bistrica rivers increased the marsh area even further.

History
At the archaic era of antiquity the winter pastures of the Vurg plain were controlled by the Chaonians when the later reached their peak of power.

In 1431 , Vurg's field belonged to sanjak of Albania. According to Ottoman register data, in 1520, the number of families in Vurg villages was 207.

Ottoman notebooks of the 17th century testify that their then inhabitants bore characteristic Albanian names, such as: Lekë (Alexander), Gjon (John), Gjin (a typical Albanian variant of the name John), Gjergj(George) etc. This proves that the majority of today's Greek-speaking inhabitants of those villages are descended from those who came or were brought there as farmers from the southernmost Greek-speaking villages there from the end of the 18th century and the beginning of the 19th century. This can also be witnessed in the toponymy of some of the villages such as Vrion, Kasemallajbej, Ymerefend, Memushbej etc.

Sources 

Geography of Vlorë County